is a Japanese rower. He competed in the men's coxless pair event at the 1992 Summer Olympics.

References

1970 births
Living people
Japanese male rowers
Olympic rowers of Japan
Rowers at the 1992 Summer Olympics
Sportspeople from Hokkaido